Byrd's Word is an album by trumpeter Donald Byrd recorded in 1955 and released on the Savoy label.

Reception

In his review for Allmusic, Stephen Cook stated "While not on par with Byrd's much more polished efforts for Blue Note, Byrd's Word is fine for fans in the mood for some loose '50s hard bop". The Penguin Guide to Jazz regarded the recording as a routine session for Savoy: "Foster plays with intermittent enthusiasm and the rhythm section show some sparkle, but one feels that some of them were watching the clock."

Track listing
 "Winterset" (Frank Foster) - 7:14   
 "Gotcha Goin' n' Comin'" (Donald Byrd) - 9:53   
 "Long Green" (Donald Byrd) - 4:32   
 "Star Eyes" (Gene de Paul, Don Raye) - 7:49   
 "Someone to Watch Over Me" (George Gershwin, Ira Gershwin) - 7:38

Personnel
Donald Byrd - trumpet
Frank Foster - tenor saxophone
Hank Jones - piano
Paul Chambers - bass 
Kenny Clarke - drums

References

Savoy Records albums
Donald Byrd albums
1956 albums
Albums produced by Ozzie Cadena
Albums recorded at Van Gelder Studio